The Heiban language, Ebang, or Abul, is a Niger–Congo language in the Heiban family spoken in the town of Heiban located in the Nuba Mountains of Kordofan, Sudan.

Grammar

Nouns 
The earliest record of the Heiban noun class system was composed by Stevenson (1956/57), in which he classified each noun class into two sections, the first being for singular form and the second for plural form. Each noun class has an indicative prefix. The separation of noun classes occurs due to the nouns belonging to a certain category. Guest (1997) further contributed to the findings of Stevenson by discovering more classification for nouns.

Pronouns 
Pronouns in Heiban are categorised as ‘free pronouns’ or ‘bound pronouns’. Early recordings of the language, such as in the work of Guest (1997) only went as far as to mention free pronouns.

Guest further notes that in Heiban, an object or an animal may not be referred to with the 3rd person subject pronouns alone, but with the object suffix. Bound pronouns are morphemes in a verbal complex that refer to some participant but are not class specific.

Bound pronouns for 1st and 2nd person have specific forms to represent subject and object. In singular form, the subject and object may be identical in spelling but are assumed to have pronunciation differences. There is also a 1st person plural exclusive and inclusive for subject forms. Furthermore, there is a pronoun for 3rd person singular which is free of reference to any particular class.

Numbers 

Beyond 20, the numbers proceed to 200 in a similar manner as the teens, with only the word denoting the power of 10 changing.

References

External links
 Ebang (Heiban) and Abul basic lexicon at the Global Lexicostatistical Database

Heiban languages
Vulnerable languages